Emplawas is an Austronesian language spoken in a single village on Babar Island in South Maluku, Indonesia.

References 

Babar languages
Languages of the Maluku Islands
Endangered Austronesian languages